The women's 70 kg (154 lbs) Light-Contact category at the W.A.K.O. World Championships 2007 in Belgrade was the second heaviest of the female Light-Contact tournaments being the equivalent of the heavyweight division when compared to the Low-Kick and K-1 weight classes.  There were eight women taking part in the competition, all based in Europe.  Each of the matches was three rounds of two minutes each and were fought under Light-Contact rules.   

The tournament was won by Poland's Agnieszka Poltorak who defeated Swede Karin Edenius in the final by split decision.  Dianna Cameron from the United Kingdom and Nikolina Juricev from Croatia claimed bronze medals.

Results

Key

See also
List of WAKO Amateur World Championships
List of WAKO Amateur European Championships
List of female kickboxers

References

External links
 WAKO World Association of Kickboxing Organizations Official Site

Kickboxing events at the WAKO World Championships 2007 Belgrade
2007 in kickboxing
Kickboxing in Serbia